Bethsaida Swedish Evangelical Lutheran Church Parsonage is a historic church parsonage in La Conner, Washington.
Bethsaida Swedish Evangelical Lutheran Church was built in 1890. The parsonage building which was located next to the church, was built in Vernacular Late Victorian style. The parsonage was added to the National Register in 1990.

References

External links
  Swedish-Americans in Washington State

Lutheran churches in Washington (state)
Properties of religious function on the National Register of Historic Places in Washington (state)
Victorian architecture in Washington (state)
Buildings and structures in Skagit County, Washington
Swedish-American culture in Washington (state)
Swedish-American history
Residential buildings on the National Register of Historic Places in Washington (state)
National Register of Historic Places in Skagit County, Washington